The NWSL Challenge Cup, currently known as the UKG NWSL Challenge Cup for sponsorship reasons, is an annual tournament organized by the National Women's Soccer League (NWSL), the top-tier women's league in the United States soccer league system. The tournament is open to all NWSL teams.

The NWSL Challenge Cup was first held in 2020 as a one-off tournament to mark the league's return to action from the COVID-19 pandemic. It was the first top-tier professional sports league in the United States to restart after COVID-19 lockdowns began. Subsequently, the NWSL announced that it would return as an annual league cup competition. The current (2022) holders are the North Carolina Courage.

Records and statistics

Results by team

List of finals

References

External links

National Women's Soccer League
National association football league cups
Women's association football competitions
Women's association football competitions in North America